Liquid nitrogen—LN2—is nitrogen in a liquid state at low temperature. It is produced industrially by fractional distillation of liquid air. It is a colorless, low viscosity liquid that is widely used as a coolant.

Physical properties  
The diatomic character of the N2 molecule is retained after liquefaction.  The weak van der Waals interaction between the N2 molecules results in little interatomic interaction, manifested in its very low boiling point.

The temperature of liquid nitrogen can readily be reduced to its freezing point  by placing it in a vacuum chamber pumped by a vacuum pump. Liquid nitrogen's efficiency as a coolant is limited by the fact that it boils immediately on contact with a warmer object, enveloping the object in an insulating layer of nitrogen gas bubbles. This effect, known as the Leidenfrost effect, occurs when any liquid comes in contact with a surface which is significantly hotter than its boiling point. Faster cooling may be obtained by plunging an object into a slush of liquid and solid nitrogen rather than liquid nitrogen alone.

Handling
As a cryogenic fluid that rapidly freezes living tissue, its handling and storage require thermal insulation.  It can be stored and transported in vacuum flasks, the temperature being held constant at 77 K by slow boiling of the liquid. Depending on the size and design, the holding time of vacuum flasks ranges from a few hours to a few weeks. The development of pressurised super-insulated vacuum vessels has enabled liquid nitrogen to be stored and transported over longer time periods with losses reduced to 2% per day or less.

Uses
Liquid nitrogen is a compact and readily transported source of dry nitrogen gas, as it does not require pressurization. Further, its ability to maintain temperatures far below the freezing point of water makes it extremely useful in a wide range of applications, primarily as an open-cycle refrigerant, including:
in cryotherapy for removing unsightly or potentially malignant skin lesions such as warts and actinic keratosis
to store cells at low temperature for laboratory work
in cryogenics
in a cryophorus to demonstrate rapid freezing by evaporation 
as a backup nitrogen source in hypoxic air fire prevention systems
as a source of very dry nitrogen gas
for the immersion, freezing, and transportation of food products
for the cryopreservation of blood, reproductive cells (sperm and egg), and other biological samples and materials
to preserve tissue samples from surgical excisions for future studies
to facilitate cryoconservation of animal genetic resources
to freeze water and oil pipes in order to work on them in situations where a valve is not available to block fluid flow to the work area; this method is known as a cryogenic isolation
for cryonic preservation in hopes of future reanimation
for shrink-fitting machinery parts together
as a coolant
for CCD cameras in astronomy
for a high-temperature superconductor to a temperature sufficient to achieve superconductivity
to maintain a low temperature around the primary liquid helium cooling system of high-field superconducting magnets used in e.g. nuclear magnetic resonance spectrometers and magnetic resonance imaging systems
for vacuum pump traps and in controlled-evaporation processes in chemistry
as a component of cooling baths used for very low temperature reactions in chemistry
to increase the sensitivity of infrared homing seeker heads of missiles such as the Strela 3
to temporarily shrink mechanical components during machine assembly and allow improved interference fits
for computers and extreme overclocking
for simulation of space background in vacuum chamber during spacecraft thermal testing
in food preparation, such as for making ultra-smooth ice cream. See also molecular gastronomy.
in container inerting and pressurisation by injecting a controlled amount of liquid nitrogen just prior to sealing or capping
as a cosmetic novelty giving a smoky, bubbling "cauldron effect" to drinks. See liquid nitrogen cocktail.
as an energy storage medium
in freeze branding cattle

Culinary

The culinary use of liquid nitrogen is mentioned in an 1890 recipe book titled Fancy Ices authored by Mrs. Agnes Marshall, but has been employed in more recent times by restaurants in the preparation of frozen desserts, such as ice cream, which can be created within moments at the table because of the speed at which it cools food. The rapidity of chilling also leads to the formation of smaller ice crystals, which provides the dessert with a smoother texture. The technique is employed by chef Heston Blumenthal who has used it at his restaurant, The Fat Duck, to create frozen dishes such as egg and bacon ice cream. Liquid nitrogen has also become popular in the preparation of cocktails because it can be used to quickly chill glasses or freeze ingredients. It is also added to drinks to create a smoky effect, which occurs as tiny droplets of the liquid nitrogen come into contact with the surrounding air, condensing the vapour that is naturally present.

Origin
Nitrogen was first liquefied at the Jagiellonian University on 15 April 1883 by Polish physicists Zygmunt Wróblewski and Karol Olszewski.

Safety

In an incident on January 12, 2006 at Texas A&M University, the pressure-relief devices of a tank of liquid nitrogen were malfunctioning and later sealed. As a result of the subsequent pressure buildup, the tank failed catastrophically. The force of the explosion was sufficient to propel the tank through the ceiling immediately above it, shatter a reinforced concrete beam immediately below it, and blow the walls of the laboratory 0.1–0.2 m off their foundations.

Because of its extremely low temperature, careless handling of liquid nitrogen and any objects cooled by it may result in cold burns. In that case, special gloves should be used while handling. However, a small splash or even pouring down skin will not burn immediately because of the Leidenfrost effect, the evaporating gas thermally insulates to some extent, like touching a hot element very briefly with a wet finger. If the liquid nitrogen manages to pool anywhere, it will burn severely.

As liquid nitrogen evaporates it reduces the oxygen concentration in the air and can act as an asphyxiant, especially in confined spaces. Nitrogen is odorless, colorless, and tasteless and may produce asphyxia without any sensation or prior warning.

Oxygen sensors are sometimes used as a safety precaution when working with liquid nitrogen to alert workers of gas spills into a confined space.

Vessels containing liquid nitrogen can condense oxygen from air. The liquid in such a vessel becomes increasingly enriched in oxygen (boiling point ) as the nitrogen evaporates, and can cause violent oxidation of organic material.

Ingestion of liquid nitrogen can cause severe internal damage, due to freezing of the tissues which come in contact with it and to the volume of gaseous nitrogen evolved as the liquid is warmed by body heat. In 1997, a physics student demonstrating the Leidenfrost effect by holding liquid nitrogen in his mouth accidentally swallowed the substance, resulting in near-fatal injuries. This was apparently the first case in medical literature of liquid nitrogen ingestion.  In 2012, a young woman in England had her stomach removed after ingesting a cocktail made with liquid nitrogen. In January 2021, a line carrying liquid nitrogen ruptured at a poultry processing plant in the U.S. state of Georgia, killing six people and injuring 11 others.

Production

Liquid nitrogen is produced commercially from the cryogenic distillation of liquified air or from the liquefication of pure nitrogen derived from air using pressure swing adsorption. An air compressor is used to compress filtered air to high pressure; the high-pressure gas is cooled back to ambient temperature, and allowed to expand to a low pressure. The expanding air cools greatly (the Joule–Thomson effect), and oxygen, nitrogen, and argon are separated by further stages of expansion and distillation.  Small-scale production of liquid nitrogen is easily achieved using this principle. Liquid nitrogen may be produced for direct sale, or as a byproduct of manufacture of liquid oxygen used for industrial processes such as steelmaking. Liquid-air plants producing on the order of tons per day of product started to be built in the 1930s but became very common after the Second World War; a large modern plant may produce 3000 tons/day of liquid air products.

See also
Liquefaction of gases
Industrial gas
Computer cooling
Cryogenic nitrogen plant
Liquid nitrogen engine

References

Nitrogen
Coolants
Medical equipment
Industrial gases
Liquids
Food and drink preparation
Articles containing video clips